Breel Donald Embolo (born 14 February 1997) is a professional footballer who plays as a forward for Ligue 1 club Monaco and the Switzerland national team.

Born in Cameroon, Embolo moved with his family to France before finally settling in Switzerland. After working his way through their junior teams, Embolo made his professional debut for Basel in March 2014, and won the Swiss Super League in all three of his first seasons before moving to Schalke 04 for a reported fee of €20 million. Shortly after moving to the Bundesliga, he suffered an ankle injury that ruled him out for nearly a year. He later played in Germany for Borussia Mönchengladbach and in the French Ligue 1 for Monaco.

Embolo made his senior international debut in 2015, earning over 60 caps. He represented Switzerland at the UEFA European Championship in 2016 and 2020, and at the FIFA World Cup in the 2018 and 2022.

Early life
Embolo was born on 14 February 1997 in the Cameroonian capital Yaoundé. His parents separated when he was young, and at the age of five or six, his mother moved to France where he attended school; he was raised between Toulouse and Paris. Whilst there she met her future husband, a Swiss national. The following year, the family moved to Basel in Switzerland.

Embolo received Swiss citizenship on 12 December 2014. His girlfriend Naomi gave birth to their daughter Naliya in June 2018.

Club career

Early career
Embolo started his youth football with Nordstern. At the age of ten, Embolo failed his first trial with Basel, so he moved to the Old Boys. He was finally allowed to join the FCB youth system in their U-13 team. In the 2011–12 and 2012–13 seasons he played in Basel's U-16. With the U-16 team he won the Swiss Championship title twice at this level. He received various individual prizes, such as the Basel youngster of the year 2013. On 8 March 2013, just three weeks after his 16th birthday, he signed his first professional contract with the club. In summer 2013 he advanced to play in their U-18 and U-21 teams.

FC Basel
During the winter break of their 2013–14 season, Embolo advanced to Basel's first team under head coach Murat Yakin. After appearing in two test games, Embolo made his professional debut on 13 March 2014 as a 90th-minute substitute for Geoffroy Serey in the Europa League round of 16 first leg at St. Jakob-Park. The match against Red Bull Salzburg ended in a goalless draw. Three days later, he made his domestic league debut in the home game in the St. Jakob-Park, coming on as a substitute in the 85th minute. Embolo scored his first goal for the team four minutes later, concluding a 5–0 win against Aarau. At the end of the 2013–14 Super League season he won the league championship with Basel; they also reached the final of the 2013–14 Swiss Cup, but Embolo sat on the bench as they were beaten 2–0 by Zürich after extra time.

In their 2014–15 season new head coach was Paulo Sousa, and Embolo advanced to becoming a regular player and a regular goal scorer. On 4 November 2014, he scored his first goal in the UEFA Champions League, opening a 4–0 home group win against Ludogorets Razgrad. In the second round of the 2014–15 Swiss Cup, the match on 21 September in the Schützenwiese, Embolo scored his first hat-trick for the team as they won 4–0 against Winterthur to advance to the next round. Basel reached the cup final, however, for the third consecutive season they finished the competition as runners-up. During the 2014–15 league season, in the match at home on 12 April 2015, Embolo scored his first domestic league hat-trick as Basel won 5–1 against Zürich. At the end of the season Basel won the championship for the sixth time in a row. After winning the title, Embolo called Raphael Wicky, the club's under-18 manager, and requested that he play their remaining games now the senior season was over.

Basel hired Urs Fischer as their new head coach for their 2015–16 season. Basel played in the 2015–16 UEFA Europa League group stage, and Embolo achieved two goals in eight appearances and the team completed the group stage coming top in table. Late into the 2016 January transfer window, VfL Wolfsburg made a bid for Embolo, but it was rejected by Basel. The bid was reported to be close to €27 million. Under Fischer, Embolo won a third consecutive Swiss championship at the end of the 2015–16 Super League season. In June 2016, Embolo was described by FourFourTwo as "one of Europe's hottest prospects".

On 26 June 2016 Basel announced that Embolo would leave the club and that he had signed a five-year contract. It was agreed not to disclose the terms of the transfer. During his time with their first team, Embolo played a total of 91 games for Basel and scored 31 goals. 61 of these games were in the Swiss Super League, six in the Swiss Cup and 24 in the UEFA competitions (Champions League and Europa League) . He scored 21 goals in the domestic league, six in the cup, and four in the European games.

Schalke 04

On 26 June 2016, Bundesliga side Schalke 04 confirmed the signing of Embolo from Basel on a five-year deal, for a reported fee of €20 million plus add-ons. He made his debut on 20 August in the first round of the DFB-Pokal away to sixth-tier FC 08 Villingen, starting and scoring in a 4–1 victory. A week later he made his league debut in a 1–0 loss at Eintracht Frankfurt, replacing Franco Di Santo at half time in the season opener.

He scored his first league goals for the Gelsenkirchen-based club on 2 October, a brace in a 4–0 win over Borussia Mönchengladbach. Eleven days later in his next match against Augsburg, he suffered a serious injury following a foul from Kostas Stafylidis, a complicated ankle fracture, ruptured syndesmosis and medial collateral ligament damage which ruled him out for the remainder of the season.

On 16 September 2017, Embolo made his return after missing nearly a full year of football, coming on as an 80th-minute substitute for Amine Harit in a 2–1 win at Werder Bremen.

Borussia Mönchengladbach
Embolo signed for fellow Bundesliga club Borussia Mönchengladbach on 28 June 2019 on a four-year contract. He made his debut in the first round of the DFB-Pokal on 9 August, coming on at half time for Jonas Hofmann in a 1–0 win at SV Sandhausen. Fifteen days later, again from the bench, he scored his first goal for the club in a 3–1 win at Mainz 05.

On 27 October 2021, Embolo scored twice in a 5–0 surprise win over FC Bayern Munich in the cup second round – Bayern Munich's biggest ever defeat in the DFB-Pokal, and their first ever cup elimination to Gladbach.

Monaco
On 15 July 2022, Embolo joined Ligue 1 club Monaco for a four-year deal. The transfer fee paid to Mönchengladbach was reported as a little over €12 million. He made his debut on 2 August in a Champions League third qualifying round first leg at home to PSV Eindhoven, as a 76th-minute substitute for Aleksandr Golovin, while his first league game four days later was a start in a 2–1 win at Strasbourg. On 13 August, he scored his first goal to equalise in a 1–1 draw with Rennes at the Stade Louis II.

International career

Embolo made four appearances for the Switzerland U16 national team. He scored his first international goal on 1 November 2012 in the 3–0 away win against the Ukraine U16. He was also eligible to play for Cameroon, however in December 2014 he pledged his international allegiance to Switzerland.

He made his senior international debut on 31 March 2015, replacing Josip Drmić after 56 minutes of an eventual 1–1 friendly draw against the United States in Zürich. On 9 October, he scored his first international goal, a penalty in a 7–0 win over San Marino at the AFG Arena in St Gallen, converting after Alessandro Della Valle fouled Eren Derdiyok; the result qualified the Swiss to UEFA Euro 2016. In the same game, he also set up Michael Lang for the first goal and won a spot-kick scored by Johan Djourou.

Embolo was selected by manager Vladimir Petković for the final tournament in France. A substitute in the first two group games, he then started against the hosts in a goalless draw in Lille and came off the bench in the last 16, a 1–1 draw and penalty shootout loss to Poland.

In qualification for the 2018 FIFA World Cup, Embolo scored once to open a 2–0 win over European champions Portugal at his former club ground in Basel. Petković named him for the squad to compete in the finals in Russia.

Embolo scored once in UEFA Euro 2020 qualifying, putting the Swiss 3–0 up in an eventual 3–3 draw at home to Denmark on 27 March 2019. At the finals, held in 2021, he scored the opener in their first group game, a 1–1 draw with Wales in Baku.

In Switzerland's first game of the 2022 FIFA World Cup against Cameroon, Embolo scored the only goal, becoming the first player in tournament history to score a goal for their adopted country against their nation of birth. Out of respect, he chose not to celebrate, standing still with his hands up to his face as his teammates mobbed him and did the more vigorous celebrating.

Style of play

UEFA.com writer Steffen Potter praised Embolo as a complete striker: "He is powerful, technically strong and decisive. He has explosive pace and is a composed finisher." Fabian Frei, who was a midfielder for FC Basel at the same time with Embolo, complimented him as well, for keeping his feet on the ground.I think he is a sensation – playing like that aged 17. I like him as a person as much as I do as a player. His feet will stay on the ground – he won't be shooting from 50 metres to score the goal of the season. You can give him good advice and he is ready to take it without getting angry.

Embolo has cited Mario Balotelli as one of his inspirations. Both players like to lurk between defenders and both have great control allied to physical prowess.

Embolo can also play in midfield; according to David Lemos of Radio Télévision Suisse he resembles N'Golo Kanté in this role, using his power to retrieve the ball and give it to the attackers.

Personal life 
At the age of 18, he created the Embolo Foundation to support refugee children in Switzerland and disadvantaged youth in his birth country of Cameroon.

Career statistics

Club

International

Scores and results list Switzerland's goal tally first, score column indicates score after each Embolo goal.

Honours
Basel Youth
 U16 Swiss Champion: 2011–12, 2012–13

Basel
 Swiss Super League: 2013–14, 2014–15, 2015–16

Individual
 FC Basel Young Player of the Year: 2013
 Swiss Footballer of the Year: 2015
Swiss Cup Top goalscorer: 2014–15 
Swiss Super League Player of the Year: 2015–16
Swiss Super League Team of the Year: 2015–16

References

External links

Profile at the AS Monaco FC website
Profile season 2015/16 on the Swiss Football League homepage
Profile at UEFA.com
Breel Embolo at Topforward

1997 births
Living people
Footballers from Yaoundé
Association football forwards
Naturalised citizens of Switzerland
Swiss men's footballers
Switzerland youth international footballers
Switzerland under-21 international footballers
Switzerland international footballers
Swiss people of Cameroonian descent
Swiss sportspeople of African descent
Swiss Super League players
Bundesliga players
Ligue 1 players
FC Basel players
FC Schalke 04 players
Borussia Mönchengladbach players
AS Monaco FC players
UEFA Euro 2016 players
2018 FIFA World Cup players
UEFA Euro 2020 players
2022 FIFA World Cup players
Swiss expatriate footballers
Expatriate footballers in Germany
Swiss expatriate sportspeople in Germany
Expatriate footballers in Monaco
Swiss expatriate sportspeople in Monaco